Dorcadion frustrator is a species of beetle in the family Cerambycidae. It was described by Plavilstshikov in 1958. It is known from the Caucasus.

References

frustrator
Beetles described in 1958